Uka or UKA may refer to:
 UKA (festival), a Norwegian cultural festival
 Uka (village), a depopulated village in Kamchatka, Russia, or the river that flows through it
 Uka Airport, a decommissioned airfield in Kamchatka, Russia
 Uka (singer), Mongolian singer
 Unicompartmental knee arthroplasty, a surgery to relieve arthritis of the knee
 UK Athletics, a sports governing body
 United Klans of America, a branch of the Ku Klux Klan
 Ükä, a dialect of Standard Tibetan